Adana Cinema Museum is a museum in Adana, Turkey dedicated to the cinema of Turkey, in particular in relation with directors, actors and producers native to the city. Established in 2011 in a renewed old Adana house, the museum is situated on the west side of Seyhan River.

The ground floor of the museum is reserved for the movie posters. At least one name in each poster (director, actor, scriptwriter etc.) belongs to a citizen of Adana.

In the first floor, there is a room exhibiting the photos, movie posters and belongings of the renowned Turkish actor Yılmaz Güney (1937-1984). There are life-size figures of Yılmaz Güney, painter Abidin Dino and author Orhan Kemal (1914-1970). Photos and artifacts on display of other well-known people from Adana associated with cinema are writer Yaşar Kemal (born 1923), actor Şener Şen (born 1941) and his father actor Ali Şen (1918-1989), Muzaffer İzgü (born 1933), Ali Özgentürk (born 1947), Orhan Duru, Aytaç Arman (born 1949), Bilal İnci, Meral Zeren, Menderes Samancılar, Nurhan Tekerek and Mahmut Hekimoğlu. There is also a library in the museum.

References

External links
For images

Museums in Adana
Cinema museums
Seyhan
Film organizations in Turkey
Museums established in 2011
2011 establishments in Turkey